A66, A 66 or A-66 may refer to:
 A66 State Route (Australia), a road in South Australia connecting Keith and Port MacDonnell
 A66 road (England), a road connecting Middlesbrough and Penrith/Workington
 A66 motorway (France), a road connecting Villefranche-de-Lauragais and Pamiers
 A66 motorway (Germany), a road connecting the Taunus and Fulda
 A66 motorway (Spain), a road connecting Gijón and Seville
 Benoni Defense, in the Encyclopaedia of Chess Openings
 HLA-A66, an HLA-A serotype